The Heritage Flight Museum is an aviation museum located at Skagit Regional Airport just west of Burlington, Washington.

History
The museum was founded by the family of Apollo 8 astronaut William Anders in 1996 and was originally located at Bellingham International Airport. The museum moved to Skagit Regional Airport in 2013.

The museum announced plans for an expansion in 2018. Ground was broken on 22 March 2021.

Collection

 Beechcraft AT-11 Kansan
 Beechcraft T-34 Mentor
 Beechcraft T-34 Mentor
 Beechcraft T-34 Mentor
 Bell H-13 Sioux
 Bell UH-1B Iroquois
 Boeing-Stearman PT-13 Kaydet
 Canadian Car & Foundry Harvard IV – converted to resemble a Mitsubishi A6M2 Zero
 Cessna O-1 Bird Dog
 Cessna O-2 Skymaster
 de Havilland Canada DHC-2 Beaver
 Douglas A-1 Skyraider
 Fairchild PT-19
 Interstate Cadet
 Mikoyan-Gurevich MiG-21PFM
 North American AT-6D Texan
 North American AT-6F Texan
 North American P-51D Mustang
 Northrop F-89J Scorpion
 Stinson L-13

See also
List of aerospace museums

References

External links
Official website

Aerospace museums in Washington (state)
Museums in Skagit County, Washington
Military and war museums in Washington (state)
William Anders